Terrell Tilford (born July 22, 1969) is an American film, stage, and television actor best known for roles as Eric Bishop on Switched at Birth (2015–2017), David Grant on Guiding Light (1998–2001), as Greg Evans on One Life to Live (2009–2010), as Ramon Rush in the Lifetime drama series The Protector (2011), as Sean Clarke on the scripted series Single Ladies, and its recurring role as Malik on Soul Food for Showtime in 2004.

Beginnings
Born in Los Angeles, California, Tilford is a classically trained actor who received a MFA in Theater from Rutgers University and a BA from the University of California at Berkeley.

Television and film career 
He is best known for his recurring roles on Showtime's Soul Food, as a mutated Klingon in Star Trek: Enterprise and for his recurring roles as Detective David Grant in Guiding Light from 1998 to 2001, and Dr. Bob Carrington on Days of Our Lives in 2008. Tilford was also in the cast of One Life to Live in the contract role of Dr. Greg Evans from June 2009 to November 2010.

Tilford's other television appearances include CSI: NY, Bones, Shark, Lincoln Heights (recurring), Girlfriends, All of Us (two-episode arc), Just Legal (recurring), Half & Half, My Wife & Kids,CSI: Crime Scene Investigation, The District, MDs (recurring), 24, and Cosby.

His film credits include Jackson, The DL Chronicles in the episode "Robert"; Jacob's Trouble; Serenity; Intersection; A Year and A Day; and A.I. Assault for the Sci-Fi Channel.

Theater career
He played Pontius Pilate in the Black Dahlia Theatre production of The Last Days of Judas Iscariot;
For his Geffen Playhouse debut as Darren Lemming in the West Coast premiere of Richard Greenberg's Tony Award-winning play Take Me Out, Tilford's performance was recognized by the Hollywood Reporter, the Daily Variety and the Los Angeles Times among several publications; 
Yellowman (original workshop production) at the McCarter Theatre;
The Memorandum at The Guthrie (invited artist-in-residence experience); 
The Exonerated (original cast and Theatre LA Ovation Award nomination for Best Ensemble Performance) at The Actors' Gang; 
Malcolm X in El-Hajj Malik: Malcolm X at the National Black Arts Festival; 
The Rivals at Rutgers; 
Involuntary Homicide at The Actors' Gang; 
The African Company Presents Richard III at Rutgers; 
Prisoner of 2nd Avenue for the Fox Diversity Showcase; 
Dutchman at the Zoo Café; 
The Colored Museum at CalArts; 
Miss Julie at HERE (NY); 
Wait Until Dark at Rutgers; 
The LA Theater Works production of Stick Fly, opposite Justine Bateman, Dule Hill and Carl Lumbly.

Filmography
Recurring roles
2000: Guiding Light as David Grant (121 episodes)
2002: MDs as Levy Hall (4 episodes)
2004: Soul Food as Malik Todd (6 episodes)
2008: Days of Our Lives Dr. Bob Carrington (8 episodes)
2011: The Protector as Ramon 'Romeo' Rush (13 episodes)
2012-13: Single Ladies as Sean Clarke (Seasons 2-3)
2014- : The Young and the Restless as Barton Shelby
Other TV series
1993: Coach as a senior in episode "One for the Road"
1999: Cosby as Mr. Lee in episode "The Vessy Method"
2002: 24 as Paul Wilson in 11:00 p.m.-12:00 a.m.
2003: The District as Raynel in the episode "Free Byrd"
2004: CSI: Crime Scene Investigation as George Craven in episode "Viva Las Vegas"
2004: My Wife and Kids as Rama in episode "The Return of Bobby Shaw"
2005: Enterprise as Marab in 2 episodes: "Divergence" and "Affliction"
2005: Half & Half as Julian Houston in episode "The Big Pomp & Circumstance Episode"
2005: All of Us as Peyton Calhoun in 2 episodes "Legal Affairs" Parts 1 and 2
2006: Girlfriends as Michael Daniels in episode "I'll Be There for You... But Not Right Now"
2006: Just Legal as A.D.A. Steven Yeager in the episode "The Heater"
2007: Lincoln Heights as Vice Principal Omar Caffey in two episodes: "Manchild" and "Betrayal" 
2007: Shark as Randal Hairston in episode "Blind Trust"
2007: CSI: NY as Dr. Quinn Brookman in episode "What Schemes May Come"
2007: The DL Chronicles as Robert Hall in episode "Robert"
2007: Bones as Dr. Kyle Aldridge in episode "Intern in the Incinerator"
2009: 24 as Agent Reynolds in Day 7: 8:00 p.m.-9:00 p.m.
2009-2010: One Life to Live as Greg Evans (120 episodes)
2011: NCIS: Naval Criminal Investigative Service as Navy Captain Jack Painter in episode "Dead Reflection"
2012: This American Housewife as Dan (1 episode)
2014: CSI: Crime Scene Investigation as Adrian Graham in episode "Rubbery Homicide"
2015: Switched at Birth as Eric (6 episodes)
2015: Agents of S.H.I.E.L.D. as Agent Hart
2016: Madam Secretary as Detective
2018: Lucifer as Robert Ertz in episode "Quintessential Deckerstar"
2020: Switched at Birth as Eric (10 episodes)

Films
2005: Intersection as Troy (short) 
2005: Serenity as news anchor 
2005: A Year and a Day as a resident 
2006: Jacob's Trouble as Omar Daniels (short) 
2006: A.I. Assault as Mike Kirby (TV film)
2008: Jackson as Jeff
2009: Dark House as Detective Williams
2009: Maneater as Dr. Moore (TV mini-series)
2011: The Doctor as Christopher Rodas (TV film)
2012: Broken Roads as Brian Pierson (post-production)
2012: Henry IV / H4 as Westmoreland (filming)
2013: The Get Away as Sylvester
2014: Blackbird as Pastor Crandall
2015: The Summoning as TJ (TV film)
2015: H4 as Westmoreland
2015: Busted as Shawn

Awards / Nominated
In 2010, Tilford was nominated for a 41st NAACP Image Award as "Outstanding Actor in a Daytime Drama Series" for his role as Dr. Greg Evans on ABC's One Life to Live.

Personal life
In 1998, Tilford met actress Victoria Platt as they worked opposite one another on Guiding Light. Tilford married actress Victoria Platt on September 29, 2001. The couple welcomed their daughter Marley, on August 24, 2014. On September 29, 2021, their 20th wedding anniversary, the couple announced their plans to divorce.

He is also a noted Art collector and artist himself.

References

External links

1969 births
Rutgers University alumni
American male film actors
American male soap opera actors
American male television actors
Living people
University of California, Berkeley alumni
American male stage actors
20th-century American male actors
21st-century American male actors
Male actors from Los Angeles